The Flintstones is a comic series spun off from The Flintstones animated series. Various comic book publishers have created their own versions.

The 2016 comic book by DC Comics reimagines the 1960s  Hanna Barbera properties alongside
Scooby Apocalypse, Wacky Raceland and Future Quest.

Titles

Reception
The 2016 Flintstones comic has gained mostly positive critical reviews.

References

The Flintstones
Comics based on television series
DC Comics titles
Humor comics
Harvey Comics titles
Marvel Comics titles
Charlton Comics titles
Blackthorne Publishing titles
Archie Comics titles
Gold Key Comics titles
Dell Comics titles
Comics set in prehistory
Hanna-Barbera comics